Chuuk International Airport  is an airport located on Weno (formerly Moen), the main island of the State of Chuuk (formerly Truk) in the Federated States of Micronesia.

History 

Chuuk International Airport was originally built by Japan between November and December 1942. Back then it was known as Harushima Airfield to the Japanese or Moen Air Field 1. With around 80 support buildings including a large hangar and underground storage for fuel and ammunition, it was used by fighter, bomber and reconnaissance aircraft at Naval Base Truk. Between October 4, 1944 and June 27, 1945, the airfield was attacked by USAAF aircraft.

Airlines and destinations 
Like many islands within the region, commercial air service is rather limited.

For many years the only service was the three-times-weekly Island Hopper flight between Guam and Honolulu operated by United Airlines, (formerly Continental Micronesia), plus another weekly flight between Guam and Pohnpei. In June 2015, Nauru Airlines resumed a once-weekly service but ended in 2016.

Incidents and accidents
28 September 2018 - Air Niugini Flight 73, a Boeing 737-800, landed short of the runway and came to rest in a lagoon. One passenger died and was recovered later by divers. The remaining 35 passengers and 11 crew escaped serious injury.

References

External links 

Chuuk (Truk) Visitors Center: Diver's Haven (Archive)
AirNav.com: FAA information for PTKK
CruisinAltitude.com's photo essay of TKK (Archive)

Airports in the Federated States of Micronesia
Weno
International airports in the Federated States of Micronesia